Velgošti is a village in the municipality of Ohrid, North Macedonia. It has a primary school called Živko Čingo dedicated to the author born there.

Demographics
According to the statistics of the Bulgarian ethnographer Vasil Kanchov from 1900, 1220 inhabitants lived in Velgošti, 1190 Bulgarian Exarchists and 30 Muslim Bulgarians. 

As of the 2021 census, Velgošti had 3,141 residents with the following ethnic composition:
Macedonians 2,673
Persons for whom data are taken from administrative sources 394
Others 66
Vlachs 8

According to the 2002 census, the village had a total of 3,060 inhabitants. Ethnic groups in the village include:

Macedonians 3,002
Serbs 8
Aromanians 10
Others 40

References

Villages in Ohrid Municipality